This is an alphabetical list of the fungal taxa as recorded from South Africa. Currently accepted names have been appended.

Ha
Genus: Hadotrichum
Hadotrichum phragmitis Fuck.

Genus: Haematomma (Lichens)
Haematomma coccineum Korb. var. porphyricum Th.Fr.
Haematomma fenzlianum Massal
Haematomma fenzlianum var. pulvinare Zahlbr.
Haematomma puniceum Massal.
Haematomma puniceum f. rufopallens Wain.
Haematomma puniceum var. africanum Steiner.
Haematomma puniceum var. breviculum Zahlbr.
Haematomma puniceum var. collatum Zahlbr.
Haematomma puniceum var. rufidulum Zahlbr.
Haematomma puniceum var. subarthonioideum Zahlbr.

Genus: Hamaspora (Rusts)
Hamaspora longissima Koem.

Genus: Hanseniospora
Hanseniospora guillermondii Pijper.

Genus: Haplodothella
Haplodothella chaenostoma Werd.

Genus: Haplodothis
Haplodothis chaenostoma Theiss.

Genus: Haploravenelia
Haploravenelia baumiana Syd.
Haploravenelia inornata Diet.
Haploravenelia natalensis Diet.

Genus: Haplosporangium
Haplosporangium bisporale Thaxt.

Genus: Haplosporella
Haplosporella hesperidica Speg.
Haplosporella mali Petrak & Syd.

Genus: Harknessia
Harknessia uromycoides Speg.

He
Genus: Helbeloma
Helbeloma nudipes Karst.
Helbeloma spoliatum Gill.

Genus: Helicobasidium
Helicobasidium compactum Boedyn.
Helicobasidium mompa Tan.
Helicobasidium purpureum Pat.

Genus: Helicomyces
Helicomyces cinereus Mass.

Genus: Helminthocarpon
Helminthocarpon natalense Vain.

Genus: Helminthosporium
Helminthosporium accedens Syd.
Helminthosporium bicolor Mitra.
Helminthosporium brizae Nisikado.
Helminthosporium capense Thuem.
Helminthosporium crustaceum P.Henn.
Helminthosporium cynodontis Marign.
Helminthosporium dematoideum Bubak & Wrobl.
Helminthosporium dolichi Syd.
Helminthosporium dorycarpum Mont. (group)
Helminthosporium gramineum Rabenh.
Helminthosporium halodes Drechsl.
Helminthosporium leersii Atk.
Helminthosporium leucostylum Drechsl.
Helminthosporium miyakei Nisikado.
Helminthosporium oryzai Breda de Haan.
Helminthosporium palmetto Gerard
Helminthosporium ravenelii Berk. & Curt.
Helminthosporium rostratum Drechsl.
Helminthosporium sacchari Butler.
Helminthosporium sativum Pammel, King & Bakke.
Helminthosporium sigmoideum Cab.
Helminthosporium stenospilum Drechsl.
Helminthosporium teres Sacc.
Helminthosporium turcicum Pass.
Helminthosporium sp.

Family: Helotiaceae

Order:Helotiales

Genus: Helotium
Helotium aeruginosum Fr.
Helotium capense Kalchbr. & Cooke
Helotium claro-flavum Berk.
Helotium conformatum Karst.
Helotium epihyllum Fr.
Helotium ferrugineum Fr.
Helotium purpuraturn Kalchbr.
Helotium scutellatum Kalchbr. & Cooke

Genus: Helvella
Helvella mitra Linn.

Family: Helvellaceae

Genus: Hemiarcyria
Hemiarcyria clavata Rost.

Family: Hemihysteriae

Genus: Hemileia
Hemileia ancylanthi Syd.
Hemileia canthii Berk. & Br.
Hemileia evansii Syd.
Hemileia fadogiae Syd.
Hemileia scholzii Syd.
Hemileia vastatrix Berk. & Br.
Hemileia woodii Kalchbr. & Cooke

Family: Hemisphaericeae

Genus: Hendersonia
Hendersonia magnoliae Sacc.
Hendersonia osteospermi Wakef.
Hendersonia rubi West.
Hendersonia sparsa Wint.
Hendersonia wistariae Cooke

Genus: Hendersonula
Hendersonula toruloidea Nattrass.

Genus: Heppia (Lichens)
Heppia azurea Vain
Heppia guepini Nyl.
Heppia guepini var. nigrolimbata Nyl
Heppia mossamedana Wain
Heppia nigrolimbata Nyl.

Family: Heppiaceae

Genus: Heterochaete
Heterochaete andina Pat. & Lagerh.

Family: Heterodermaceae

Genus: Heterosporium
Heterosporium avenae Oud.
Heterosporium echinuiatum Cooke
Heterosporium gracile Sacc.
Heterosporium groenlandicum Allesch.
Heterosporium munduleae Syd.
Heterosporium ornithogali Klotzsch.
Heterosporium secalis Dipp.

Genus: Heterothecium
Heterothecium marine Müll.Arg.

Genus: Hexagona
Hexagona albida Berk.
Hexagona crinigera Fr.
Hexagona decipiens Berk.
Hexagona dermatiphora Lloyd.
Hexagona discopoda  Pat. & Har.
Hexagona dregeana Lev.
Hexagona dybowskii Pat.
Hexagona friesiana Speg.
Hexagona glabra Lev.
Hexagona hystrix Har. & Pat.
Hexagona orbiculata Fr.
Hexagona peltata Fr.
Hexagona phaeopora Pat.
Hexagona pobeguini Har.
Hexagona polygramma Mont. ex Fr.
Hexagona rigida Berk.
Hexagona sacleuxii Har.
Hexagona similis Berk.
Hexagona sinensis Fr.
Hexagona speciosa Fr.
Hexagona stuhlmanni P.Henn.
Hexagona subvelutina Wakef.
Hexagona tenuis Fr.
Hexagona tenuis var. natalensis Fr.
Hexagona thollonis Pat. & Har.
Hexagona tricolor Fr.
Hexagona umbrinella Fr.
Hexagona zambesiana Torrend.

Hi
Genus: Himantia
Himantia stellifera Johnston.

Genus: Hirneola
Hirneola auricula-judae Berk.
Hirneola auricularis Fr.
Hirneola auriformis Fr.
Hirneola cochleata Fr.
Hirneola delicata Bres.
Hirneola fusco-succinea P.Henn.
Hirneola hemispierica Fr.
Hirneola nigra Fr.
Hirneola nigra var. fusco-succinea Fr.
Hirneola rufa Fr.
Hirneola polytricha Mont.
Hirneola squamosa Lloyd.
Hirneola vitellina Fr.

Genus: Histoplasma
Histoplasma capsulatum Darling.

Ho
Genus: Holstiella
Holstiella usambarensis P.Henn.

Genus: Homostegia
Homostegia albizziae Herl. & Vogl.
Homostegia amphimelaena Sacc.
Homostegia piggottii Karst.

Genus: Hormodendron
Hormodendron cladosporioides Sacc.
Hormodendron pedrosoi Brumpt.
Hormodendron resinae Lindau.

Genus: Hormomyces
Hormomyces aurantiacus Bon.
Hormomyces calloriodies Sacc.

Hu
Genus: Humaria
Humaria epitricha Berk.

Genus: Humarina
Humarina leucoloma Seaver.
Humarina sp.

Hy
Genus: Hyalinia
Hyalinia crystallina Boud.

Genus: Hyalodema
Hyalodema evansii Magn.

Family: Hyaloscyphaceae

Family: Hydnaceae

Genus: Hydnangium
Hydnangium cameum Wallr.
Hydnangium nigricans Kalchbr.

Genus: Hydnum
Hydnum ambiguum Berk. & Br.
Hydnum auriscalpium Linn, ex Fr.
Hydnum cinnabarinum Fr.
Hydnum coralloides Scop, ex Fr.
Hydnum tiavidum Lloyd.
Hydnum henningsii Bres.
Hydnum longispinosum Lloyd ex v.d.Bvl 
Hydnum mucidum Pers.
Hydnum ochraceum Pers. ex Fr.
Hydnum pudorinum Fr.
Hydnum pulcher Lloyd
Hydnum pulchrum Lloyd
Hydnum sclerodontium Berk. & Mont.
Hydnum setosum Bres.

Genus: Hydrophora
Hydrophora stercoraria Tode.

Genus: Hygrophorus
Hygrophorus atro-coccineus Kalchbr.
Hygrophorus coccineus Fr.
Hygrophorus conicus Fr.
Hygrophorus discolor Kalchbr. & MacOwan
Hygrophorus virgineus Fr.

Genus: Hymenochaete
Hymenochaete dregeana Mass.
Hymenochaete fasciculata Talbot.
Hymenochaete fulva Burt.
Hymenochaete fusco-violascens v.d.Byl.
Hymenochaete luteo-badia v.Hohn. & Litsch
Hymenochaete nigricans Bres.
Hymenochaete ochromarginata Talbot.
Hymenochaete pellicula Berk. & Br.
Hymenochaete rubiginosa Lev.
Hymenochaete semistupposa Petch.
Hymenochaete tabacina Lev.
Hymenochaete tabacina var. australis Mont.
Hymenochaete tenuissima Berk.
Hymenochaete tristicula Mass.

Genus: Hymenogaster
Hymenogaster albellus Mass. & Rodway.
Hymenogaster arenarius Tul.
Hymenogaster levisporus Mass. & Rodway.
Hymenogaster lilacinus Tul.
Hymenogaster radiatus Lloyd
Hymenogaster zeylanicus Petch.

Family: Hymenogastraceae

Order:Hymenogastrales

Order:Hymenomycetales

Family: Hymenomyceteae

Genus: Hyphaster
Hyphaster kutuensis P.Henn.

Genus: Hyphoderma
Hyphoderma laetum Karst.

Genus: Hypholoma
Hypholoma candolleanum Quel.
Hypholoma capnolepis Sacc.
Hypholoma capnoides Quel.
Hypholoma fasciculare Quel.
Hypholoma hydrophilum Quel.
Hypholoma noli-tangere Fr.

Family: Hypochnaceae

Genus: Hypochnus
Hypochnus evlesii v.d.Byl.
Hypochnus puniceus Sacc.

Genus: Hypocrea
Hypocrea camea Kalchbr. & Cooke.
Hypocrea chrysostigrna Kalchbr. & Cooke.
Hypocrea citrina Fr.
Hypocrea inandae Cooke
Hypocrea lycogalae Kalchbr. & Cooke
Hypocrea rufa Fr.
Hypocrea subcitrina Kalchbr. & Cooke
Hypocrea sulphurella Kalchbr. & Cooke
Hypocrea traehycarpa Syd.
Hypocrea sp.

Family:Hypocreaceae

Genus: Hypomyces
Hypomyces chrysospermus Tul.
Hypomyces ipomoeae  Wollenw.

Genus: Hyponectria
Hyponectria sutherlandiae Theiss.

Genus: Hypoxylon
Hypoxylon africanum v.d.Byl
Hypoxylon annulatum Mont.
Hypoxylon argillaceum Fr.
Hypoxylon cetrarioides Welw. & Curr.
Hypoxylon clypeus Schw.
Hypoxylon colliculosum Nitschke.
Hypoxylon concentricum Fr.
Hypoxylon cornutum Hoffm.
Hypoxylon deustum (Hoffm.) Grev., (1828), accepted as Kretzschmaria deusta (Hoffm.) P.M.D.Martin, (1970)
Hypoxylon exutans Cooke.
Hypoxylon fuscum Fr.
Hypoxylon gilletianum Sacc.
Hypoxylon glomeratum Cooke.
Hypoxylon haematostroma Mont.
Hypoxylon hypomiltum Mont.
Hypoxylon kalchbrenneri Sacc.
Hypoxylon lepidum v.d.Byl.
Hypoxylon malleolus Berk. & Rav.
Hypoxylon mediterraneum Miller.
Hypoxylon multiforme Fr.
Hypoxylon natalense Berk.
Hypoxylon placenta Kalchbr.
Hypoxylon punctulatum Berk. & Rav.
Hypoxylon rubiginosum Pers. ex Ft.
Hypoxylon serpens (Pers.) Fr., (1835), accepted as Nemania serpens (Pers.) Gray, (1821)
Hypoxylon stygium Sacc.
Hypoxylon suborbiculare Welw. & Curr.
Hypoxylon truncatum Miller.

Genus: Hypsilophora
Hypsilophora calloeioides Kalchbr. & Cooke

Genus: Hysterangium
Hysterangium niger Lloyd

Family: Hysteriaceae

Order: Hysteriales

Genus: Hysterographium
Hysterographium acaciae Doidge
Hysterographium fraxini de Not. var. oleastri Desm.
Hysterographium spinicolum Doidge

Genus: Hysterostoma
Hysterostoma acocantherae Theiss. & Syd.
Hysterostoma areolata Nel.
Hysterostoma capense Syd.
Hysterostoma colae Hansf.
Hysterostoma faureae Doidge.
Hysterostoma microspora Doidge.
Hysterostoma orbiculata Syd.

Genus: Hysterostomella
Hysterostomella bosciae Doidge.
Hysterostomella concentrica Syd.
Hysterostomella opaca Doidge
Hysterostomella oxyanthae Doidge
Hysterostomella tenella Syd.

Genus: Hysteromina
Hysteromina euclea v.d.Byl.
Hysteromina opaca Syd.
Hysteromina oxyanthae Doidge
Hysteromina tenella Syd.

References

Sources

See also
 List of bacteria of South Africa
 List of Oomycetes of South Africa
 List of slime moulds of South Africa

 List of fungi of South Africa
 List of fungi of South Africa – A
 List of fungi of South Africa – B
 List of fungi of South Africa – C
 List of fungi of South Africa – D
 List of fungi of South Africa – E
 List of fungi of South Africa – F
 List of fungi of South Africa – G
 List of fungi of South Africa – H
 List of fungi of South Africa – I
 List of fungi of South Africa – J
 List of fungi of South Africa – K
 List of fungi of South Africa – L
 List of fungi of South Africa – M
 List of fungi of South Africa – N
 List of fungi of South Africa – O
 List of fungi of South Africa – P
 List of fungi of South Africa – Q
 List of fungi of South Africa – R
 List of fungi of South Africa – S
 List of fungi of South Africa – T
 List of fungi of South Africa – U
 List of fungi of South Africa – V
 List of fungi of South Africa – W
 List of fungi of South Africa – X
 List of fungi of South Africa – Y
 List of fungi of South Africa – Z

Further reading
Kinge TR, Goldman G, Jacobs A, Ndiritu GG, Gryzenhout M (2020) A first checklist of macrofungi for South Africa. MycoKeys 63: 1-48. https://doi.org/10.3897/mycokeys.63.36566

  

Fungi
Fungi H